The Trinity is the Christian doctrine of one God in three persons.

Trinity may also refer to Trinity (nuclear test), a nuclear weapon test in New Mexico, United States. Other uses include:

Characters
Trinity (comics character), a DC comics supervillain
Trinity (Team Tejas), an Aztecan superhero
Trinity (The Matrix), a character in The Matrix franchise
Team Trinity, a group of Mobile Suit Gundam 00 characters
Trinity, a character in the films They Call Me Trinity (1970) and Trinity Is Still My Name (1971)
Trinity, a character in the 2007 novel The Girl Who Kicked the Hornets' Nest by Stieg Larsson
Sister Trinity, a character in Warrior Nun Areala
Trinity Collins (née LaFleur), a recurring character in Trailer Park Boys

Education
Trinity College (disambiguation)
Trinity School (disambiguation)
Trinity University (disambiguation)

Enterprises
TRINITY, an acronym for Troitsk Institute of Innovative and Thermonuclear Research, a Russian scientific research center
Trinity Hospice, Blackpool, Lancashire, England
Trinity Centre, Aberdeen, Scotland
Trinity Leeds, England
Trinity Industries, Dallas, Texas

Film and television
Trinity (2003 film), a 2003 British science fiction film
Trinity (2016 film), a 2016 American psychological thriller film
Blade: Trinity, a 2004 action film
Trinity (American TV series), a 1998 drama series
Trinity (British TV series), a 2009 drama series
"Trinity" (Stargate Atlantis), a 2005 episode of Stargate Atlantis
"Trinity" (Supergirl), an episode of Supergirl
Trinity Broadcasting Network

Games
Trinity (role-playing game), a 1997 role-playing game by White Wolf
Trinity (video game), a 1986 interactive fiction game by Infocom
Trinity, a fictional group in Rise of the Tomb Raider and Shadow of the Tomb Raider

Literature
Trinity (novel), a 1976 novel by Leon Uris
Trinity (comic book), a 2008–2009 weekly series
Trinity: A Graphic History of the First Atomic Bomb, a 2012 graphic novel by Jonathan Fetter-Vorm
Batman/Superman/Wonder Woman: Trinity, a 2003 three-issue series
Trinity, a 2001–02 fantasy trilogy by Fiona McIntosh
Trinities, a 1994 novel by Nick Tosches

Music

Artists 
Brian Auger and the Trinity, a 1960s British musical group
Trinity of Carnatic music, an eighteenth-century group of three composers
Trinity, a musical group featuring Vivian Campbell
Trinity (Thai band) a Thai boy band formed in 2019
The Trinity Band, an English musical group formed in 2004

Albums 
Trinity (Clea album) (2006)
Trinity (Tommy Flanagan album) (1976)
Trinity (Shizuka Kudo album) (1992)
The Trinity (EP), a 2013 EP by The Lox
Trinity (Mat Maneri album) (1999)
Trinity (Joe McPhee album) (1972)
Trinity (My Dying Bride album) (1995)
The Trinity (album), a 2005 album by Sean Paul
Trinity (Prototype album) (2002)
Trinity (Revolution Renaissance album) (2010)
Trinity (Past, Present and Future), a 2002 album by Slum Village
Trinity (Visions of Atlantis album) (2007)

Songs 
"Trinity", a 1972 song by Fleetwood Mac from 25 Years – The Chain
"Trinity", a 2010 song by Paper Tongues

People
Trinity (given name), a popular name for girls
Trinity (musician) or Wade Brammer (born 1954), Jamaican reggae artist
Trinity (wrestler) or Stephanie Finochio (born 1971), American stuntwoman and professional wrestler
Trinity Baptiste (born 1998), American basketball player
Trinity Benson (born 1997), American football player (male)
Trinity Rodman (born 2002), American soccer player

Places

Canada
Trinity (electoral district) (1935–1988), Ontario
Trinity, Bonavista Bay, Newfoundland and Labrador
Trinity, Newfoundland and Labrador
Trinity Bay (Newfoundland and Labrador), a bay
Trinity–Bellwoods, Toronto
Trinity—Conception (1949–1968), a federal electoral district in Newfoundland and Labrador
Trinity Islands, Nunavut, one of the Baffin Island offshore island groups
Mount Trinity or Three Sisters, British Columbia

United Kingdom
Trinity, Angus
Trinity, Edinburgh, Scotland
Trinity Gask, a parish in West Perthshire, Scotland

United States
Trinity, Alabama
Trinity, Florida
Trinity, Indiana
Trinity, Kentucky
Trinity (Rosedale, Louisiana), a National Register of Historic Places listing in Iberville Parish, Louisiana
Trinity, Mississippi
Trinity, North Carolina
Trinity, Texas
Trinity, Virginia
Trinity Alps, a mountain range in California
Trinity County, California
Trinity Center, California, a census-designated place in the county
Trinity Lake, formed by the Trinity Dam
Trinity Lakes AVA, a California wine region in Trinity County
Trinity Village, California, a census-designated place in the county
Trinity County, Texas
Trinity Islands, Alaska, including Tugidak Island
Trinity Mountain (Idaho), Boise National Forest, Idaho
Trinity River (California)
Trinity River (Texas)

Other places
Trinity Peninsula, Antarctica
Trinity, Argentina, location of Esperanza base, a permanent Antarctic research station
Trinity, Jersey
Trinity, Saint Kitts and Nevis

Religion
Ayyavazhi Trinity, the incarnation of God in Ayyavazhi theology
Hindu Trinity or Trimurti
Trika Shaivism, or Kashmir Shaivism, a Hindu Shakta-Shaiva tradition centered on a trinity (trika) of three goddesses
Trinity Sunday, in Christian liturgical calendars
The Three Pure Ones in Daoism

Sport
Gainsborough Trinity F.C., an English football club
Wakefield Trinity, an English rugby club

Technology
Trinity (desktop environment), a fork of KDE 3, a desktop environment for Linux
AMD Trinity, a codename for the first iteration of the 'Piledriver' generation AMD Accelerated processing units
 HTC P3600, a PDA phone, codenamed Trinity
 Trinity of 1977, refers to the release of the first popular home computers; see 
 Korg Trinity, a 1995 music workstation released by Korg

Visual arts
Trinity (Andrei Rublev), a 1425 painting
Trinity, a seventeenth-century painting by Bartolomé Esteban Murillo

Other uses
Trinity (supercomputer), a computer at Los Alamos National Laboratory, Los Alamos, New Mexico, United States
Trinity House, a lighthouse authority board
Trinity house (Philadelphia), a type of small townhouse principally found in Philadelphia, Pennsylvania
Trinity metro station, a metro station in Bangalore, India
Trinity term
Trinity Tower, a skyscraper in Jakarta, Indonesia
Trinity Towers, Washington, D.C.
Trinity Building, part of the Wall Street Historic District in New York City, New York, United States
Trinity Peak, a mountain in Pakistan

See also
Holy Trinity (disambiguation)
Operation Trinity (disambiguation)
Santísima Trinidad (disambiguation) ('Holy Trinity' in Spanish)
Trilogy (disambiguation)
Trinitaria (disambiguation)
Trinity Bridge (disambiguation)
Trinity Church (disambiguation)
Trinity (comics), a list of comics
Trinity Court, Gray’s Inn Road
Trinity Foundation (disambiguation)
Trio (disambiguation)
Triple deity, a theme commonly found in human history
Unholy Trinity (disambiguation)